Balankine may refer to several places in the Ziguinchor Region of Senegal:

Balankine Nord (rural commune of Oulampane)
Balankine Sud (rural commune of Ouonck)